Hamdallaye may refer to:
                
 Hamdallaye, Burkina Faso, a village in Tikare Department, Bam Province, Burkina Faso
 Hamdallaye, Mali, a village in Mali and the former capital of the Masina Empire 
 Hamdallaye, Niger, a village and commune in Niger
 Hamdallaye is a neighbourhood of Bamako   
 Hamdallaye is a neighbourhood of Conakry